Luciano Martín Toscano (born 17 August 1972), commonly known as Luci, is a Spanish retired footballer who played as a central defender, and is a current coach.

Managerial statistics

References

External links

1972 births
Living people
Sportspeople from the Province of Huelva
Spanish footballers
Footballers from Andalusia
Association football defenders
Segunda División players
Segunda División B players
Tercera División players
CD San Roque de Lepe footballers
Sevilla Atlético players
Recreativo de Huelva players
Levante UD footballers
AD Ceuta footballers
Spanish football managers
Segunda División B managers
Sevilla Atlético managers